Edgardo Damián Simovic Ramses (born 8 February 1975, in Montevideo) is a Uruguayan soccer player.

He plays as a central forward for Deportivo Maldonado.

Club career
He started his career at Uruguayan side Liverpool FC (Montevideo) in 1994, and was loaned to Portugal Marítimo in 1996.

He also played in Argentina, Ecuador, Paraguay, Honduras, Mexico, Iran and Bulgaria.

References

External links
  
 Profile at Tenfiel Digital 
 Argentine Primera statistics  

1975 births
Living people
Uruguayan footballers
Uruguayan expatriate footballers
Liverpool F.C. (Montevideo) players
Miramar Misiones players
C.D. Marathón players
Club Olimpia footballers
Nueva Chicago footballers
Zob Ahan Esfahan F.C. players
S.D. Aucas footballers
OFC Vihren Sandanski players
Expatriate footballers in Argentina
Expatriate footballers in Paraguay
Expatriate footballers in Portugal
Expatriate footballers in Mexico
Expatriate footballers in Honduras
Expatriate footballers in Peru
Expatriate footballers in Iran
Expatriate footballers in Bulgaria
Expatriate footballers in Ecuador
Liga Nacional de Fútbol Profesional de Honduras players
First Professional Football League (Bulgaria) players
Footballers from Montevideo
Uruguayan expatriate sportspeople in Portugal
Uruguayan expatriate sportspeople in Bulgaria
Association football forwards